NGC 3269 is a barred spiral or lenticular galaxy in the constellation Antlia.

References

Antlia
Lenticular galaxies
3269
18340501
Antlia Cluster
030945